Léon Gambetta (1838–1882) was a French statesman.

Léon Gambetta may also refer to:

 , French armoured cruiser, launched in 1901 and torpedoed in 1915
 , a class of armoured cruisers of the French Navy, including Léon Gambetta, Jules Férry, and Victor Hugo

Gambetta, Leon